Eric Lionel Mascall  (1905–1993) was a leading theologian and priest in the Anglo-Catholic tradition of the Church of England. He was a philosophical exponent of the Thomist tradition and was Professor of Historical Theology at King's College London (in the University of London). His name was styled as E. L. Mascall in most of his writings.

Mascall was for many years one of the major figures in British theology and well respected on the Continent and in North America. He authored more than 20 books, in which he expounded Anglican theology in its most Catholic of forms.  Mascall was arguably the most influential in a group of like-minded theologians, most of whom had predeceased him – Austin Farrer, Gregory Dix, Lionel Thornton and Gabriel Hebert.

Life
Born in London on 12 December 1905, Eric Mascall was the son of John Mascall and his wife Susan. He was educated at Latymer Upper School, Pembroke College, Cambridge. In 1931 he entered Ely Theological College and was ordained in the Church of England in 1933.

After a period as a schoolmaster at Bablake School, Coventry, Mascall was ordained priest in 1933 at Southwark Cathedral, serving his first curacy at St Andrew's, Stockwell. In 1935 he crossed the river to St Matthew's, Westminster in the Diocese of London. Subsequently, he taught theology at Lincoln Theological College and Christ Church, Oxford. He joined the Oratory of the Good Shepherd in 1938. In 1962 he became Professor of Historical Theology at King's College London and followed this appointment by a period as canon theologian of Truro Cathedral. He retired in 1973 and continued to live in the clergy house of St Mary's, Bourne Street. He spent part of 1976 as a visiting professor at the Gregorian University at Rome.

Mascall died on 14 February 1993 in Seaford, East Sussex.

Intellectual interests
Mascall was a devout Anglo-Catholic but his early studies were in mathematics. He took a first in the subject at Pembroke College, and the Mathematical Tripos at Cambridge. He remained engaged in relations between the Anglican Communion, Roman Catholic Church and Eastern Orthodox Churches. Mascall wrote on many theological themes as well as natural theology; these included the above-mentioned ecumenism in The Recovery of Unity (1958), science and religion in his Bampton Lectures, Christian Theology and Natural Science (1956), regarded by many at the time of its publication as the best book on the subject in English. His previous training in mathematics served him and readers well throughout his ministry.

Works

 He Who Is: A Study in Traditional Theism. London: Longmans, Green and Co., 1943.
 A Guide to Mount Carmel, Being a Summary and an Analysis of The Ascent of Mount Carmel by St. John of the Cross, with Some Introductory Notes. Westminster: Dacre Press, 1944.
 Christ, the Christian and the Church: A Study of the Incarnation and Its Consequences. London: Longmans, 1946.
 Existence and Analogy. A Sequel to "He Who Is". London: Longmans, Green and Co., 1949.
 The Mother of God: A Symposium by Members of the Fellowship of St. Alban and St. Sergius. London: Dacre Press, 1949.
 The Angels of Light and the Powers of Darkness: A Symposium by Members of the Fellowship of S. Alban and S. Sergius. Westminster: Faith Press, 1954.
 The Convocations and South India: What Did the Convocations Decide, and How Does Their Decision Affect the Catholicity of the Church of England, London: A. R. Mowbray and Co., 1955.
 Via Media: An Essay in Theological Synthesis]. London: Longmans, Green and Co., 1956.
 Words and Images: A Study in Theological Discourse. London: Longmans, Green and Co., 1957.
 
 Ten, który jest: studium z teizmu tradycyjnego. Warsaw: Instytut Wydawniczy Pax, 1958.
 Pi in the High. London: Faith Press, 1959.
 What Do We Mean by the Creation of the World? London: SPCK, 1960.
 Grace and Glory. London: Faith Press, 1961.
 Theology and History: An Inaugural Lecture Delivered at King's College, London, 23 October 1962. Westminster: Faith Press, 1962.
 The Blessed Virgin Mary: Essays by Anglican Writers, ed. by E.L. Mascall and H.S. Box: Darton, Longman, and Todd, 1963.
 Corpus Christi: Essays on the Church and the Eucharist. London: Longmans, 1965.
 The Secularization of Christianity: An Analysis and a Critique. London: Darton, Longman and Todd, 1965.
 The Christian Universe. London: Darton, Longman and Todd, 1966.
 "The Mother of God: An Address Given to the Ecumenical Society of the Blessed Virgin Mary", 9 January 1968. London: Ecumenical Society of the Blessed Virgin Mary, 1968.
 Words and Images: A Study in Theological Discourse. London: Darton, Longman and Todd, 1968.
 Cristianismo secularizado: análisis y crítica. Barcelona: Editorial Kairos, 1969.
 Sekularyzacja chrześcijaństwa. Warsaw: Pax, 1970.
 Théologie De L'Avenir. Desclée. Paris: 1970
 The Openness of Being: Natural Theology Today: The Gifford Lectures. London: Westminster Press, 1971.
 Women Priests? London: Church Literature Association, 1973.
 The Importance of Being Human: Some Aspects of the Christian Doctrine of Man. Westport: Greenwood Press, 1974.
 Nature and Supernature. London: Darton, Longman and Todd, 1976.
 Whatever Happened to the Human Mind?: Essays in Christian Orthodoxy. London: SPCK, 1980.
 Theology and the Gospel of Christ: An Essay in Reorientation. London: SPCK, 1980.
 Jesus: Who He is, and How We Know Him. London: Darton, Longman and Todd, 1985.
 The Triune God: An Ecumenical Study. Worthing: Churchman Publishing, 1986.
 Chrześcijańska koncepcja człowieka i wszechświata Warsaw: Instytut Wydawniczy Pax, 1986.
 Otwartość bytu: teologia naturalna dzisiaj. Warsaw: Instytut Wydawniczy "Pax", 1988.
 Saraband: The memoirs of E. L. Mascall. Herefordshire: Gracewing, 1992.

See also

References
Notes

Further reading
Hebblethwaite, Brian ‘Mascall, Eric Lionel (1905–1993)’, Oxford Dictionary of National Biography, Oxford University Press, 2004
Mascall, Rev. Canon; Eric Lionel (b. Seaford, East Sussex 12 December 1905 – d. 14 February 1993). Who's Who 2006 and Who Was Who 1897–2005 (2005)
Mascall, E. L. (1992) Saraband: The memoirs of E. L. Mascall. Leominster: Gracewing
Eric Lionel Mascall (an excerpt), from Cloud of Witnesses – Dead People I Knew When They Were Alive., Fr. Geoerge Rutler, Scepter Pubs, May 2010)
Obituary of Canon E.L. Mascall, The Independent, 17 February 1993
Proceedings of the British Academy, 1984, pp. 409–418.

External links
He Who Is: A Study in Traditional Theism, 1943. Archive.org
Existence and Analogy. A Sequel to "He Who Is", 1949. Archive.org
The Christian Universe, Mascall's 1965 Boyle Lecture
The Openness of Being, 1970–71 Gifford Lectures in Edinburgh
Mascall's essay, "Women Priests?"

1905 births
1993 deaths
English Anglo-Catholics
20th-century English theologians
English Anglican theologians
People educated at Latymer Upper School
Alumni of Pembroke College, Cambridge
Alumni of Ely Theological College
Fellows of Christ Church, Oxford
Academics of King's College London
Members of Anglican religious orders
20th-century English Anglican priests
Anglo-Catholic theologians
Anglo-Catholic clergy
Fellows of the British Academy
Writers about religion and science
Staff of Lincoln Theological College